National Highway 707  (NH 707) starts from Hatkoti and ends at Paonta Sahib, both places in the state of Himachal Pradesh. On its way to Paonta Sahib it travels through the Indian state of Uttarakhand. It passes through towns of Sataun, Kamrau, Kaffota, Chareu, Shillai, Shiri kyari, Rohnat in the state of Himachal Pradesh.

See also
 List of National Highways in India (by Highway Number)
 List of National Highways in India
 National Highways Development Project

References

External links
 NH 707 on OpenStreetMap

National highways in India
707|707
National Highways in Himachal Pradesh